Trixagus is a genus of small false click beetles in the family Throscidae. There are more than 30 described species in Trixagus.

Species
These 32 species belong to the genus Trixagus:

 Trixagus acutus (Horn, 1890)
 Trixagus algiricus (Bonvouloir, 1861)
 Trixagus asiaticus (Bonvouloir, 1859)
 Trixagus atticus Reitter, 1921
 Trixagus bachofeni Reitter, 1905
 Trixagus carinicollis (Schaeffer, 1916)
 Trixagus carinifrons (Bonvouloir, 1859)
 Trixagus chevrolati (Bonvouloir, 1859)
 Trixagus cobosi Yensen, 1980
 Trixagus dermestoides (Linnaeus, 1767)
 Trixagus duvalii (Bonvouloir, 1859)
 Trixagus elateroides (Heer, 1841)
 Trixagus extraneus Fisher, 1942
 Trixagus exul (Bonvouloir, 1859)
 Trixagus gracilis Wollaston, 1854
 Trixagus horni (Blanchard, 1917)
 Trixagus leseigneuri Muona, 2002
 Trixagus majusculus Kovalev & al., 2012
 Trixagus mendax (Horn, 1885)
 Trixagus meybohmi Leseigneur, 2005
 Trixagus micado
 Trixagus minutus Rey, 1891
 Trixagus obtusus (Curtis, 1827)
 Trixagus orientalis (Bonvouloir, 1859)
 Trixagus ovalis Reitter, 1921
 Trixagus peritulus Cockerell, 1925
 Trixagus rougeti (Fauvel, 1885)
 Trixagus sericeus (LeConte, 1868)
 Trixagus sosnovskyi (Yablokov-Khnzorian, 1962)
 Trixagus trivialis (Horn, 1890)
 Trixagus turgidus Hisamatsu, 1985
 † Throscus peritulus Cockerell, 1925

References

Further reading

External links

 

Elateroidea
Articles created by Qbugbot
Polyphaga genera